Andrews Point is a headland between Hackapike Bay and Inverleith Harbour on the northeast coast of Anvers Island, in the Palmer Archipelago. It was charted and named in 1927 by DI personnel on the RRS Discovery.

See also
Gerlache Strait Geology
Anvers Island Geology

References
 

Headlands of the Palmer Archipelago